The 1957 NC State Wolfpack football team represented North Carolina State University during the 1957 NCAA University Division football season. The Wolfpack were led by fourth-year head coach Earle Edwards and played their home games at Riddick Stadium in Raleigh, North Carolina. The team competed as a member of the Atlantic Coast Conference, winning the conference title with an undefeated 5–0–1 record. This was NC State's first conference title in the ACC, and the school's first title since 1927, when they were members of the Southern Conference.

Schedule

References

NC State
NC State Wolfpack football seasons
Atlantic Coast Conference football champion seasons
NC State Wolfpack football